Vi er allesammen tossede is a 1959 Danish comedy directed by Sven Methling and starring Kjeld Petersen, Buster Larsen, Birgitte Reimer and Dirch Passer. The film relates the story of a confused driver who is mistakenly committed to an insane asylum after he insists to police that his car was damaged in an accident with an elephant. The film received the Bodil Award for Best Danish Film in 1960 and is listed on the Danish Film Institute's Top 100 Danish Films.

Cast

References

External links 
 IMDb
 
 

1959 comedy films
1959 films
Best Danish Film Bodil Award winners
Danish comedy films
1950s Danish-language films
Films directed by Sven Methling
Films scored by Sven Gyldmark